Cynoglossum amabile, the Chinese hound's tongue or Chinese forget-me-not, is a species  of flowering plant in the family Boraginaceae, native to Asia. This plant, closely related to the common forget-me-not of temperate gardens (Myosotis sylvatica), is also grown as an ornamental. In cultivation in the UK it has gained the Royal Horticultural Society’s Award of Garden Merit. (confirmed 2017).

The Latin specific epithet amabile means “lovely”.

Toxicity
Cynoglossum amabile contains tumorigenic pyrrolizidine alkaloids such as amabiline.

References

amabile
Garden plants of Asia
Flora of China
Flora of Bhutan